The Dream Society is the twentieth studio album by Roy Harper, released in 1998.

History
The songs on the album revolve around events in Harper's life, from the early death of his mother to reaching the age of fifty. Other important events covered include the demise of his marriage, heartbreak, his experiences with drugs, psychological issues, and aspirations for humankind. Originally titled 'The Seven Ages Of Man', then 'Songs Of Love' it was finally released as 'thedreamsociety'.

Early pressings of this album (the first 3,000?) contain a bonus CD featuring excerpts from the album with comments from Harper. (Science Friction  HUCD30A). A promotional sampler with slightly different comments was also released. (Science Friction HUCD100).

Track listing
All tracks credited to Roy Harper
"Songs Of Love" – 6:59
"Songs Of Love (Pt 2)" – 4:50
"Dancing All The Night" – 6:12
"Psychopath" – 2:45
"I Want To Be In Love" – 5:58
"Drugs For Everybody" – 5:04
"Come The Revolution" – 6:09
"Angel Of The Night" – 5:10
"The Dream Society" – 8:35
"Broken Wing" – 6:42
"These Fifty Years" – 14:27

Limited Edition Bonus CD (HUCD030A)

"The Dream Society" (full version) – 8:16
"Songs Of Love" (spoken introduction) – 1:08
"Songs Of Love" (excerpt) – 1:10
"Songs Of Love (Part 2)" (spoken introduction) – 0:47
"Songs Of Love (Part 2)" (excerpt) – 1:03
"Dancing All The Night" (spoken introduction) – 1:34
"Dancing All The Night" (excerpt) – 1:02
"Psychopath" (excerpt) – 0:56
"Psychopath" (spoken introduction) – 1:49
"I Want To Be In Love" (spoken introduction) – 0:21
"I Want To Be In Love" (excerpt) – 1:20
"Drugs For Everybody" (spoken introduction) – 1:38
"Drugs For Everybody" (excerpt) – 0:54
"Come The Revolution" (spoken introduction) – 1:25
"Come The Revolution" (excerpt) – 0:57
"Angel Of The Night" (spoken introduction) – 0:23
"Angel Of The Night" (excerpt) – 1:18
"The Dream Society" (spoken introduction) – 3:27
"Broken Wing" (spoken introduction) – 0:47
"Broken Wing" (excerpt) – 1:13
"These Fifty Years" (spoken introduction) – 2:26
"These Fifty Years" (excerpt) – 1:26

Promotional Sampler CD (HUCD100)

"The Dream Society" (full version) – 8:16
"Songs Of Love" (spoken introduction) – 1:16
"Songs Of Love" (excerpt) – 1:08
"Songs Of Love" (Part 2) (spoken introduction) – 0:54
"Songs Of Love" (Part 2) (excerpt) – 1:03
"Dancing All The Night" (spoken introduction) – 0:45
"Dancing All The Night" (excerpt) – 1:00
"Psychopath" (excerpt) – 0:56
"Psychopath" / "I Want To Be In Love" (spoken introduction) – 1:16
"I Want To Be In Love" (excerpt) – 1:21
"Drugs For Everybody" (spoken introduction) – 0:30
"Drugs For Everybody" (excerpt) – 0:54
"Come The Revolution" (spoken introduction) – 0:16
"Come The Revolution" (excerpt) – 0:57
"Angel Of The Night" (spoken introduction) – 0:25
"Angel Of The Night" (excerpt) – 1:15
"The Dream Society" (spoken introduction) – 1:02
"Broken Wing" (excerpt) – 1:10
"Broken Wing" (spoken introduction) – 0:04
"These Fifty Years" (spoken introduction) – 3:30
"These Fifty Years" (excerpt) – 1:29

Personnel 

Roy Harper – acoustic guitar (tuned down to C), vocals, tambourine and washboard
Ian Anderson – flute
Steve Barnard – drums and percussion
Noel Barrett – bass
John Fitzgerald – keyboard, piano, Hammond, trumpets, concertina and harp
Nick Harper – acoustic guitar, slide (slide guitar?) on 7 and electric guitar
Felix Howard – original bass
Misumi Kosaka – vocals
Colm O'Sullivan – additional keyboard
Ric Sanders – violins
Bonnie Shaljean – harp
Jeff Ward – slide guitar and bass on 4, hand drums at end 11, mandolin, percussion Bits and everything else.
John Leckie – original recording
Jeff Ward – subsequent recording
George Fort – cover art paintings and drawings
Harry Pearce – Idea for Front cover art

References

External links 
Roy Harper Official Site
Roy Harper Live Performance Archive
A Useful Roy Harper Resource

Roy Harper (singer) albums
1998 albums